The Kruger Millions is a hoard of gold reputed to have been hidden in South Africa by or on behalf of President Paul Kruger to avoid it being captured by the British during the Second Boer War. According to legend, about two million pounds in buried gold and diamonds lie hidden in the Blyde River area in the province of Mpumalanga. The treasure is said to consist of hidden gold and coins worth more than US $500,000,000 in today’s terms. Allegedly the treasure was hidden by or for President Paul Kruger at the end of the South African Boer War somewhere between 1899 and 1902. Searches have failed to uncover any treasure.

In 1947, a man claimed to have found a portion of the treasure at Laurenco Marques, after following a map stitched into the cover of a Bible.

A South African musical drama :af:Die Krugermiljoene (1967) proposed a version of the disappearance of these millions.

In 2016, an April Fools article by the Northcliff Melville Times claimed that the Millions had been found at Emmarentia Dam.

On 25 February 2021, it was reported in a news article that Kruger ponds had been discovered in a Swiss vault. It was reported in the article that the Kruger ponds were produced in South Africa between 1893 and 1900. The Kruger ponds have been labelled the "Lost Hoard" and are for sale. According to the article, the Kruger ponds belong to the South African Mint, a subsidiary of the South African Reserve Bank and can be bought from the South African Mint. The Kruger ponds have been independently verified and graded by the Numismatic Guarantee Corporation in Florida, United States of America. Depending on the condition and year of mint of each individual coin, the value varies between R14500 - R250 000. The collection also features a replica of the original money bag in which the coins remained for over a hundred years.

The Lost Hoard coins are available in two sets. The first set features an 1893-1900 Lost Hoard Kruger half-pond with a 2019 1/10 oz gold privvy-mark proof Krugerrand. The second set comprises an 1893-1900 Lost Hoard Kruger full pond and a 2019 quarter oz gold privy-mark proof Krugerrand. The sets have limited editions of 233 and 677 units.

References 

Treasure
Paul Kruger
Second Boer War